Royal Mint can refer to any number of mints with a royal patronage, mints that have a Royal prefix include:
Royal Mint (United Kingdom)
Royal Australian Mint (Australia)
Royal Belgian Mint (Belgium)
Royal Canadian Mint (Canada)
Royal Danish Mint (Denmark)
Royal Dutch Mint (Netherlands)
Royal Hungarian State Mint, now known as the Hungarian Mint
Royal Mint of Malaysia (Malaysia)
Royal Mint (Spain)
Royal Norwegian Mint (Norway)
Royal Thai Mint (Thailand)